The RFL Community Shield is a rugby league competition for selected tier 4 leagues.

Participants

In 2012, there were 30 sides drawn from different English regions:

Eight from the North West; Eight  from Yorkshire; two from Cumbria; two from the North East; four from the Midlands; four from London / the South East / the East and two from the South West.

Most regional bodies nominated their sides on league placing within their respective competitions. The Yorkshire Men's League ran qualifiers and the North West Men's League invited the quarter finalists from their half of the Wars of the Roses Cup.

Past winners

2012 Fryston Warriors

Rugby League Conference
Rugby league competitions in the United Kingdom